"Soldering" is a song written by Ewart Beckford & Alvin Ranglin, and originally released by the Starlights featuring Stanley Beckford in 1975. Other artists who recorded it include Desmond Dekker, the Specials, and Hall & Oates. About a woman's choosiness, the title is a euphemism for sexual intercourse.

Originally a big hit in early 1975 for Jamaican Stanley Beckford under the name the Starlights (or the Starlights featuring Stanley Beckford), he is often not credited due to the lack of copyright in Jamaica at the time.

AMG's Stephen Thomas Erlewine describes Hall & Oates' cover, from the album Daryl Hall & John Oates released in late 1975, as, "fall[ing] flat," and, "reggae tinged."

References

Hall & Oates songs
1975 songs
The Specials songs
Songs written by Alvin Ranglin
Reggae songs